Chris James Beath (born 17 November 1984) is an Australian football referee in the A-League.

Refereeing career
He has refereed at the National Youth Championships in 2003 and in 2004.

Beath was the referee of the tournament at the 2002 Kanga Cup.

Beath was added to the FIFA International Referees List in 2011, serving as a referee for matches including the Kirin Challenge Cup contest between Japan and Iceland.

In 2015, Beath was involved in an exchange program where he refereed in the J-League.

On 4 April 2017, Chris Beath was appointed as one of the inaugural video assistant referees (VARs) in the Hyundai A-League, the first top-tier football league in the world to implement the technology.

In January 2018, Beath was selected as one of the referees for the 2018 AFC U-23 Championship held in China. Beath refereed the opening fixture of this tournament.

On 5 December 2018, Beath was appointed to be a referee at the 2019 AFC Asian Cup in the United Arab Emirates.

In August 2021, after the matches Mexico - France (4-1) and the quarter final Brazil - Egypt (1-0), Beath was appointed to the Brazil vs Spain 2-1 after extra time Gold Medal Match at the COVID delayed 2020 Summer Olympics.

Beath was also appointed to officiate in the 2021 FIFA Club World Cup. He refereed Al Ahly SC victory 1-0 over C. F. Monterrey and also officiated the 2021 FIFA Club World Cup Final between Chelsea F.C. and Palmeiras. 

In 2022, Beath was appointed to the 2022 AFC Cup Final as VAR.

Beath was selected to officiate at the 2022 FIFA World Cup in Qatar, officating the Group C match between Mexico and Poland. 

Beath was selected to be one of the VAR officials at the Women's World Cup 2023, held in  his home country of Australia, as well as New Zealand.

A-League Career
Matches:

Record

References

 Chris Beath

1984 births
Australian soccer referees
Living people
A-League Men referees
2022 FIFA World Cup referees
FIFA World Cup referees
AFC Asian Cup referees